Albert Osborn may refer to:

 Albert L. Osborn (1858–1940), member of the Wisconsin State Assembly
 Albert S. Osborn (1858–1946), considered the father of the science of questioned document examination in North America